Secuencia (Sequence) is the second studio album from Mexican Latin pop group Reik, released on December 12, 2006 through Sony BMG. The album features the singles "Invierno", "Me Duele Amarte", "De Qué Sirve" and "Sabes".

Track listing
"Quien Decide Es El Amor" (Love Is The One Who Decides) – 3:22 
"Sabes" (You Know) – 3:41 
"Sin Conocerte" (Without Meeting You) – 3:15 
"Me Duele Amarte" (It Hurts Me To Love You) – 3:13 
"Vivo En Sueños" (I Live In Dreams) – 3:12 
"Invierno" (Winter) – 3:38 
"De Qué Sirve" (What's The Purpose) – 3:43 
"Llegó Tu Amor" (Your Love Arrived) – 3:35 
"Quédate" (Stay) – 3:22 
"No Sé Por Qué Te Vas (I Can't Believe She's Gone)" (I Don't Know Why You're Leaving (I Can't Believe She's Gone)) – 3:49 
"Ahora Sin Ti" (Without You Now) – 2:59

iTunes bonus track
"Ahora Sin Ti" (vivo) (Without You Now (live)) – 3:15

Production credits
Kiko Cibrián – arranging, programming, engineering, producer
Mike Harris – engineering
Julian Tydelski – engineering
Carlos Álvarez Montero – photography
Manuel Ruíz – production coordination
Miguel Trujillo – A&R
Gabriel Wallach – mastering

Chart performance

Sales and certifications

References

2006 albums
Reik albums
Sony BMG Norte albums